Munshilal Khatik is an Indian politician and member of Legislative Assembly of Madhya Pradesh. He represents the Dimani- Morena (Vidhan Sabha constituency) constituency of Madhya Pradesh and is a member of the Bharatiya Janata Party political party.

Early life and education 
Munshilal born in Murena district of Madhya Pradesh. Currently chairman of Animal husbandry and poultry development corporation, Madhya Pradesh.

Political career 
Munshilal Khatik is an Indian politician and member of Legislative Assembly of Madhya Pradesh. He represents the Morena constituency of Madhya Pradesh and is a member of the Bharatiya Janata Party political party. He has been five times MLA in Morena constituency and currently chairman of animal husbandry and poultry development corporation, Madhya Pradesh.

References 

1957 births
Living people
Indian politicians